West Scottsdale is a rural locality in the local government area of Dorset in the North-east region of Tasmania. The 2016 census determined a population of 58 for the state suburb of West Scottsdale.

History
West Scottsdale was gazetted as a locality in 1956.

Geography
The Brid River forms part of the eastern boundary and then flows through to the north-east.

Road infrastructure
The C830 route (Sledge Track) enters from the south-east and runs north and east before exiting in the north-east.

References

Localities of Dorset Council (Australia)
Towns in Tasmania